Orange Austria was an Austrian mobile network operator. It started its business on 26 October 1998 as owner of the third GSM license of the country, and the first provider operating in the GSM 1800 band. Since 2004, Orange (previously known as ONE) successfully applied for a UMTS-License and offers since 2005 also UMTS Services. ONE's logo was a blue circle. It was rebranded as Orange on 22 September 2008.

With 1.9 million customers (including approximately 180,000 Tele2mobil customers) it is Austria's third largest provider with a market share of 20%. Orange cooperates with UPC Telekabel (a Liberty Global company) for landline and ISP offers.

On 3 February 2012, Hutchison Whampoa announced that it would buy all of Orange Austria for US$1.7 billion. The deal closed on 3 January 2013. The combined business created a mobile carrier with 2.8 million customers and more than 20% market share in Austria. The Orange brand continued to operate in Austria until August 19, 2013, when its operations were merged into 3.

Ownership 
Orange Austria was formerly owned by:
 France Télécom: 35%
 Mid Europa Partners: 65%

On 3 February 2012, Hutchison 3G Austria acquired 100% of Orange Austria from Mid Europa and France Télécom for US$1.7 billion. JPMorgan Chase advised Hutchison on the deal, while Morgan Stanley advised France Télécom and Mid Europa Partners.

Discount offers 

Since 2005, Orange Austria initiated two subsidiary discount companies, Yesss and Eety.

Yesss 

Yesss offers prepaid-services with various conditions. It shares the network with Orange Austria and operates under the network-codes 6998 and recently 681. The instant success of Yesss made Orange Austria's competitor A1 initiate a similar offer called BoB in 2006. Yesss itself offers neither cheap phones nor any kind of bonus-system. From time to time, there are special offers in cooperation with the supermarket Hofer.

At its beginning, some of the Austrian mobile providers protested, because Yesss operates a free unlocking service and describes how to remove the SIM lock from different phone models.

Following the sale of Orange to Hutchison Whampoa, Yesss was sold off to Mobilkom Austria.

Eety 

Eety is pretty similar to Yesss, but very dedicated to emigrants and guest workers. It offers localisation and support in many eastern- and south-European languages and offers low rates for calls to this areas. Calls to the UK/USA are also very cheap.

Other Austrian mobile providers 

 A1 / BoB
 3
 Magenta Telekom / Telering

References

External links 
  Yesss Website, yesss.at
  Eety Website, eety.at

Mobile phone companies of Austria
Companies based in Vienna
CK Hutchison Holdings
Orange S.A.